Joseph Platt (February 17, 1672  – June 12, 1748) was a member of the House of Representatives of the Colony of Connecticut from Norwalk.

He was the longest serving representative from Norwalk. He served as a member of the Connecticut House of Representatives between 1705 and 1748 representing Norwalk in 38 sessions.

He was born on February 17, 1672, in Norwalk, the youngest son of John Platt, and Hannah Clark.

He received a grant of 10 acres of land from the town of Norwalk for his services in the "swamp fight", on February 21, 1698. Joseph was a town selectman for nine years.

On June 3, 1723, he was appointed by a town meeting to be chairman of committee to seat the new meeting-house.

On February 18, 1725-6, he was appointed at town meeting to a committee to obtain, and set stones for the entrance to the meeting house. At the same meeting, he was appointed to a committee to regulate the difficulties arising from minister Buckingham.

He was a  justice of the peace for 30 years.

He also served as a commissioner to draw the boundary line between Connecticut and New York in 1720.

Joseph was Captain of the North Company, of the Norwalk Trainband.

Notable descendants 
 Grandfather of Joseph Platt Cooke (1730–1816), American military officer in the Revolutionary War, and also a member of the Connecticut House of Representatives for many years
 Zephaniah Platt
 Jonas Platt
 Charles Z. Platt
 James Kent

References 

1672 births
1748 deaths
Burials in East Norwalk Historical Cemetery
Connecticut city council members
American justices of the peace
Members of the Connecticut House of Representatives
Politicians from Norwalk, Connecticut
People of colonial Connecticut